Jarkesy v. Securities and Exchange Commission (2022) is a case that has been going on for almost a decade. In May 2022, Court of Appeals for the Fifth Circuit held, under certain statutory provisions, the Securities and Exchanges Commission's administrative adjudication of fraud claims without jury trials in their administrative proceedings with their own ALJs violated three provisions of the Constitution.

First, the enforcement of Dodd Frank's civil penalties for securities fraud in the SEC's administrative proceedings violated the Seventh Amendment's guarantee of a jury trial because (a) the case involved traditional common law claims (fraud), (b) civil penalties are a legal remedy to which the Seventh Amendment attaches, thus (c) the claims are not a matter of public rights that can be adjudicated in administrative proceedings on the mere basis the government is the plaintiff; 	Second, under the first clause of Article I, where "All legislative Powers herein granted shall be vested in a Congress of the United States, which shall consist of a Senate and House of Representatives," Dodd Frank's broad grant of unfettered discretion to the SEC to choose between enforcing identical claims in either federal district court or its own administrative tribunal violated the Nondelegation Doctrine because (a) the assignment of claims to a non-Article III tribunal is an Article I power, and (b) Congress provided—as the SEC conceded—no intelligible principle to the SEC. Third, the two layers of for-cause removal protections of ALJs violated Article II's Take Care Clause.

Background
Prior to the Dodd-Frank Wall Street Reform and Consumer Protection Act, only registered entities like broker-dealers or licensed investment advisers were subject to the Investment Advisers Act's administrative enforcement provisions. In response to the 2008 market crash, Congress purported to empower the SEC to impose harsh civil penalties against any private citizen through its own administrative adjudications with only limited, after-the-fact review by a federal court of appeals. Dodd-Frank effectively bestowed to the SEC "coextensive" authority with federal court to impose civil penalties.

In 2007 and 2009, George Jarkesy created two small hedge funds totaling  that invested in bridge loans to start-up companies, equity investments principally in microcap companies, and life settlement policies. Jarkesy brought in Patriot28 LLC as an investment advisor to these funds. In part due the 2008 market collapse, the funds lost value, and Jarkesy and Patriot28 were alleged by the SEC to have overestimated the value of the hedge fund assets and made other false claims. Under Dodd-Frank's new provisions, after an investigation, the SEC opted to use internal proceedings rather than a jury trial to evaluate its claims against Jarkesy and Patriot28. The SEC initiated the enforcement action in March 22, 2013 with its ALJ.

In 2014, Jarkesy and Patriot28 filed a collateral challenge to the administrative enforcement action in district court to stay the administrative proceedings, alleging that the proceedings violated his Seventh Amendment and Equal Protection rights, that Dodd-Frank violated the Non-delegation Doctrine, and that the ALJs violate the Appointments Clause. On appeal, the United States Court of Appeals for the D.C. Circuit in 2015 applied Thunder Basin Coal Co. v. Reich'''s implied jurisdictional preclusion of collateral lawsuits to the SEC's statutory structure, holding that federal courts do not have subject matter jurisdiction to hear even structural constitutional claims until after the adjudicative process and final order of the Commission. The D.C. Circuit did not address the merits of the constitutional objections but held that Jarkesy was required to raise and exhaust his constitutional objections—about the ALJs and the SEC—to the ALJ and the SEC before judicial review of final agency action is available.

Five years after the SEC initiated the enforcement action against Jarkesy, the Supreme Court of the United States held in Lucia v. Securities and Exchange Commission in 2018 that the SEC's ALJs are inferior officers of the Executive Branch subject to the Appointments Clause of Article II of the United States Constitution and must be appointed by the President or a delegated officer. The Supreme Court's decision allowed any defendant in pending SEC administrative proceedings before unconstitutionally appointed ALJs to request a new ALJ and hearing. Jarkesy and Patriot28 waived the Lucia error remedy to avoid prolonging the adjudicative process.

In 2020, seven years after initiating the enforcement action, the Commission concluded that based on existing evidence from the ALJ's proceedings, Jarkesy and Patriot28 were liable, and the Commission imposed $300,000 in civil penalties and $685,000 in disgorgement. Jarkesy was also barred from any future investments-related activities. Like the ALJ, the Commission also rejected each of Jarkesy's constitutional challenges. Jarkesy appealed to the Fifth Circuit.

Five months after oral argument, the SEC issued a statement revealing a control deficiency where SEC staff misappropriated internal documents relating to Jarkesy along with Cochran v. SEC  which also raised constitutional challenges before the ALJ. Dating back to 2017, adjudication staff submitted memos to the Commission, and because internal databases were improperly configured, personnel from the enforcement division had access to these adjudication memos. Under 5 U.S.C. § 554(d) of the Administrative Procedure Act (APA), these memoranda are supposed to be kept confidential within divisions to keep adjudicative, investigative and prosecutorial staff separated. The SEC claimed that while ten reports were affected, they did not find any evidence that the improper disclosures impacted its findings. This led to additional criticism of the SEC's enforcement practices from groups such as the U.S. Chamber of Commerce and called for reform of the SEC.

Fifth Circuit
The Fifth Circuit ruled on May 18, 2022, 2-1 in favor of Jarkesy. Judge Jennifer Walker Elrod, writing for the majority, found the SEC's administrative enforcement against Jarkesy to be unconstitutional in three ways:

 The enforcement of civil penalties for fraud before ALJs denies  the accused the right to a jury trial  guaranteed by the Seventh Amendment of the United States Constitution. Generally, Congress can create public rights if Congress properly assigns to administrative adjudication claims that are foreign to common law if jury trials would "go far to dismantle the statutory scheme" or "impede swift resolution" of the claims created by statute. However, civil penalties for fraud were known to the common law,3 William Blackstone, Commentaries on the Laws of England *42 (explaining the common-law courts’ jurisdiction over “actions on the case which allege any falsity or fraud; all of which savour of a criminal nature, although the action is brought for a civil remedy; and make the defendant liable in strictness to pay a fine to the king, as well as damages to the injured party”). and Congress assigned the same claims to district court where the SEC routinely seeks civil penalties with jury trials.See, e.g., SEC v. Fowler, 6 F.4th 255, 258–60 (2d Cir. 2021); SEC v. Johnston, 986 F.3d 63, 71 (1st Cir. 2021); SEC v. Life Partners Holdings, Inc., 854 F.3d 765, 772 (5th Cir. 2017); SEC v. Quan, 817 F.3d 583, 587 (8th Cir. 2016); SEC v. Miller, 808 F.3d 623, 626 (2d Cir. 2015); SEC v. Jasper, 678 F.3d 1116, 1119, 1121–22 (9th Cir. 2012); SEC v. Seghers, 298 F. App’x 319, 321 (5th Cir. 2008). Though The Supreme Court explained in Granfinanciera, S.A. v. Nordberg that "Congress cannot eliminate a party’s Seventh Amendment right to a jury trial merely by relabeling the cause of action to which it attaches and placing exclusive jurisdiction in an administrative agency or a specialized court of equity." Thus, the Fifth Circuit held that the claims were not properly assigned to an administrative tribunal, and the SEC's decade-long administrative enforcement action against Mr. Jarkesy violated his Seventh Amendment right to a jury trial. 
 Congress' delegation to the SEC of absolute discretion to select, carte blanche, either an in-house adjudication—in front of the SEC's own ALJs and no Seventh Amendment right—or in federal district court—where defendants have a right to demand a jury trial—for the same claims violates the Nondelegation Doctrine because Congress provided no intelligible principle. The SEC contended that the agency's broad discretion under Dodd Frank to choose between administrative and district court did not have nor need an intelligible principle because, it contended, the choice of forum is prosecutorial discretion under Heckler v. Cheney, though there is no precedent that applies unreviewable Heckler discretion to an agency's purported carte blanche choice of enforcing the same cases in either in-house administrative proceedings or in district court. Judge Elrod explained that Congress uniquely possesses the power to assign claims to non-Article III tribunals and determine procedural rights for enforcement actions, and that power cannot be wholesale delegated to a federal agency with no intelligible principle to guide the agency's decision as to which claims and cases to assign to administrative proceedings.
 Finally, ALJs are considered inferior officers under Article II but had at least two layers of for-cause protection from removal, which interfered with the President's ability to Take Care that the laws be faithfully executed.

Judge Andy Oldham joined Judge Elrod in the majority. Senior Judge W. Eugene Davis dissented.

The attorney for Jarkesy is S. Michael McColloch, while Daniel J. Aguilar of the Civil Division of the Department of Justice argued for the SEC.

Impact
ALJs are used by more than 30 administrative agencies, and the decision by the Fifth Circuit might impact how ALJs are used at these agencies if the decision stands. However, at the end of March 2022, the SEC only had seven pending administrative enforcement actions in front of its three ALJs. Legal experts believe Jarkesy is the first case that has held an administrative enforcement action brought to its ALJ must be tried by a jury. Others point out that this is the first case in eighty years where Congress failed to provide an intelligible principle to survive a non-delegation challenge.

The Supreme Court had already granted certiorari to Axon Enterprise, Inc. v. Federal Trade Commission and Cochran v. SEC for the 2022-23 term, which address whether defendants in administrative proceedings can challenge in district court the constitutionality of ALJs within the Federal Trade Commission and the SEC before final agency action. The Supreme Court granted the petition for certiorari in Securities and Exchange Commission v. Cochran two days prior to the Fifth Circuit's decision.

 References 

 External links 
 Fifth Circuit decision Jarkesy v. SEC'', No. 20-61007, 2022 U.S. App. LEXIS 13460 | __ F.4th __ | 2022 WL 1563613, 2022 BL 172464 (5th Cir. May 18, 2022)

United States Seventh Amendment case law
United States Constitution Article One case law
Civil liberties in the United States
Administrative law
Appointments Clause case law
United States separation of powers case law